The India women's national under-18 basketball team is a national basketball team of India and is governed by the Basketball Federation of India. 
It represents the country in international under-18 (under age 18) women's basketball competitions.

Competitive history

FIBA U-19 Women's World Cup
  1985 to  2023 : Did not qualify

FIBA U-18 Women's Asian Championship
  1980 : 4th
  1982 : 6th
  1989 : 5th
  1990 : 6th
  1996 : 6th
  1998 : 9th
  2000 : 9th
  2002 : 7th
  2004 : 8th
  2007 : 7th
  2008 : 6th
  2010 : 8th
  2012 : 7th
  2014 : 6th
  2016 : 6th
  2018 (Div B) : 1st
  2022 : 8th

See also
India women's national basketball team
India women's national under-16 basketball team
India men's national under-18 basketball team

References

External links
Archived records of India team participations

Under
Women's national under-18 basketball teams
Basketball